Anas Jamal Hijah (or) Anas Hajji is a retired Jordanian footballer of Palestinian descent who played for the Jordan national football team.

Career
Hijah's first match with the Jordan national senior team was against Cyprus in a friendly international on 16 October 2010 at Amman, which resulted in a 0–0 draw, entering as a substitute for his teammate Ahmad Abdel-Halim.

Honors and participation in international tournaments

In AFC Asian Cups 
2011 Asian Cup

International goals

U-20

Senior
Scores and results list Jordan's goal tally first.

References 

 Anas Hijah to Al-Dohuk (IRQ)
 Al-Faisaly (Amman) Make Agreements With Anas Hijah and Wait for His Signature 
 Hijah Officially Signs Up for Shabab Al-Ordon  
 Anas Hijah Signs Up for Al-Riffa of Bahrain for $70,000  
 of Bahrain Terminates the Contract of Anas Hijah  
 Al-Ordon Welcomes Back Anas Hijah

External links 
 
 
 
 
 
 

1987 births
Living people
Jordanian footballers
Jordan international footballers
Jordan youth international footballers
Association football midfielders
Jordanian expatriate footballers
Expatriate footballers in Iraq
Expatriate footballers in Bahrain
Jordanian expatriate sportspeople in Bahrain
Jordanian expatriate sportspeople in Iraq
2011 AFC Asian Cup players
Jordanian Pro League players
Iraqi Premier League players
Bahraini Premier League players
Al-Faisaly SC players
Riffa SC players
Shabab Al-Ordon Club players
Duhok SC players
Al-Hussein SC (Irbid) players
Al-Jazeera (Jordan) players
Al-Baqa'a Club players
That Ras Club players